Potters Hill is an unincorporated community and census-designated place (CDP) in Duplin County, North Carolina, United States.

Potters Hill is located in eastern Duplin County along North Carolina Highway 41, which leads northeast  to U.S. Route 258 and southwest  to NC 24 at Beulaville. The northeastern edge of the Potters Hill CDP follows the Jones and Onslow County lines.

Demographics

References

Census-designated places in Duplin County, North Carolina
Census-designated places in North Carolina